The 2013 Red Bull MotoGP Rookies Cup season was the seventh season of the Red Bull MotoGP Rookies Cup. The season began at Circuit of the Americas on 20 April and ended on 29 September at the Ciudad del Motor de Aragón after 14 races. The races, for the first year contested by the riders on equal KTM 250cc 4-stroke Moto3 bikes, were held at eight meetings on the Grand Prix motorcycle racing calendar.

Czech rider Karel Hanika won the championship, securing the title after the Misano race.

Calendar

Entry list

Championship standings
Points were awarded to the top fifteen finishers. Rider had to finish the race to earn points.

References

External links
 
 Season at FIM-Website

Red Bull MotoGP Rookies Cup
Red Bull MotoGP Rookies Cup racing seasons